Geoffrey Charles Walter Dowling (12 August 1891 – 30 July 1915) was an Australian cricketer active from 1911 to 1913 who played for Sussex. He was born in Melbourne and died in Hooge, Belgium during the First World War, serving as a captain in the 7th Battalion of the King's Royal Rifle Corps. He appeared in four first-class matches and scored 123 runs with a highest score of 48.

Notes

1891 births
1915 deaths
Australian cricketers
Sussex cricketers
Cricketers from Melbourne
British military personnel killed in World War I
British Army personnel of World War I
King's Royal Rifle Corps officers